Bruce Edge (30 April 1924 – 29 September 1994) was an Australian rules footballer who played with Melbourne in the Victorian Football League (VFL).

Edge played three consecutive matches for Melbourne in 1945, from rounds 16 to 18, before returning to play out the season with Rochester Football Club.

Notes

External links 

Bruce Edge Profile at Demonwiki

1924 births
Australian rules footballers from Victoria (Australia)
Melbourne Football Club players
Rochester Football Club players
1994 deaths